Liphyra is a butterfly genus in the family Lycaenidae. It was first described by John O. Westwood in 1864. The larvae are predatory and feed on ant larvae. They are among the largest species of lycaenid butterflies. There are several species in the genus which are found in Asia and Australia. In the genus Liphyra, the antenna tapers gradually.

Species
 Liphyra brassolis Westwood 1864 - moth butterfly
 Liphyra castnia Strand, 1911
 Liphyra grandis Weymer, 1902

References

External links
 List of Liphyra species names (not all are valid)

Miletinae
Lycaenidae genera
Taxa named by John O. Westwood